The Umma Party was a Marxist political party in Zanzibar.  It was founded in 1963 by disaffected socialist Arabs from the ruling Zanzibar Nationalist Party and had several internal factions, including Marxist-Leninists, Maoists, and anarcho-socialists.  It was led by Abdulrahman Muhammad Babu and supported the Afro-Shirazi Party during the 1964 Zanzibar Revolution.  Babu was made Minister of External Affairs following the revolution.  The party merged into the Afro-Shirazi Party on 8 March 1964.

References

Bibliography 
.
.

Arab diaspora in Tanzania
Arab socialist political parties
Defunct political parties in Zanzibar
Political parties of minorities
1963 establishments in Zanzibar
Socialist parties in Tanzania